San Antonio is an unincorporated community in Buchanan County, in the U.S. state of Missouri.

History
A post office called San Antonio was established in 1855, and remained in operation until 1901. The community's name most likely is a transfer from San Antonio, Texas.

References

Unincorporated communities in Buchanan County, Missouri
Unincorporated communities in Missouri